Fly Between Falls was the first album by Animal Liberation Orchestra to be released on Brushfire Records, although it was not their first record. It was originally released on Lagmusic Records in 2005 but was re-released on Brushfire in 2006. It features Brushfire artist Jack Johnson on the track "Girl I Wanna Lay You Down." New to the re-released version of the album is the track "Walls of Jericho," which has become a crowd favorite.

Track listing

Personnel
Animal Liberation Orchestra
Steve Adams – bass, acoustic upright bass, lead vocals on track 8, backing vocals on tracks 1, 4, 5, 6, 7, 9 and "Possibly Drown", pennywhistle on track 2, wood flute on track 2, production
Dave Brogan – drums, percussion, lead vocals on tracks 2, 5 and 10, backing vocals on "Possibly Drown", quinto on track 1, clavinet on track 2, tambourine on track 6, shakers on track 6, synthesizer on tracks 5 and 8, piano on tracks 9 and 10, guitar on track 5, production
Zach Gill – accordion on tracks 1, 2 and "Girl, I Wanna Lay You Down (Live from the Greek Theatre)", piano on tracks 5, 7 and 8, rhodes piano on tracks 3, 4, 6, 8, 9 and "Possibly Drown", lead vocals on tracks 1, 2, 3, 4, 6, 7, 9, "Possibly Drown" and "Girl, I Wanna Lay You Down (Live from the Greek Theatre)", backing vocals on tracks 5, 8 and 10, ukulele on tracks 1 and 4, wurlitzer on tracks 2 and 10, jaw harp on track 1, synthesizer on tracks 4, 7 and 9, clavinet on tracks 4 and 7, organ on track 8 and "Possibly Drown", production
Dan Lebowitz – guitar, lap steel guitar on tracks 2 and 9, backing vocals on tracks 1, 4, 5, 6, 7, 9, "Possibly Drown" and "Girl, I Wanna Lay You Down (Live from the Greek Theatre)", congas on tracks 1, 2 and 6, tumba on track 1, bongos on track 1, production

Additional personnel
Jack Johnson – vocals on track 3 and "Girl, I Wanna Lay You Down (Live from the Greek Theatre)", guitar on "Girl, I Wanna Lay You Down (Live from the Greek Theatre)"
Tim Young – guitar on track 10
Dave Simon-Baker – backing vocals on track 3, engineering on tracks 3 and 4, mixing on tracks 3 and 4
Scott Theakston – production, engineering, mixing
Robert Carranza – engineering on "Girl, I Wanna Lay You Down (Live from the Greek Theatre)", mixing on "Girl, I Wanna Lay You Down (Live from the Greek Theatre)"

References

2006 albums
Animal Liberation Orchestra albums